The Grand Han Righteous Army (大漢義軍) was a collaborationist Chinese army cooperating with the Empire of Japan in campaigns in northern China  and Inner Mongolia immediately prior to the official start of hostilities of the Second Sino-Japanese War.

History
The Grand Han Righteous Army was formed by minor warlord and commander of the Chahar People's Anti-Japanese Army Wang Ying after his defeat by the Imperial Japanese Army in what now part of Inner Mongolia in 1936.

Wang defected to the Kwantung Army and persuaded the Japanese to permit him to recruit unemployed Chinese soldiers in Chahar Province to form a mercenary army with Japanese advisors. He managed to recruit approximately 6,000 men, who were trained by the Japanese and organized into four infantry brigades in Japanese-occupied northern Chahar. The troops were armed with weapons seized from Northeastern Army armories and warehouses in northern China. That force was attached another Japanese proxy army, the Inner Mongolian Army, under the overall command of Mongol Prince Teh Wang.

During the Invasion of Suiyuan the Inner Mongolian Army attacked Hongort on November 15, 1936. After several days of fighting, the attackers failed to capture the town. On November 17, a Chinese counterattack surprised the invaders and led to a disorganized retreat. Taking advantage of the disorder among the Mongolian forces, Chinese General Fu Zuoyi made a flanking movement to the west of the Mongolian headquarters at Pailingmiao, attacked and captured it, and routed the defenders. The Japanese transported Wang and his Grand Han Righteous Army by trucks into a location near Pai-ling-miao and launched a counterattack, which failed dismally on December 19. With the bulk of its men captured or killed, the Grand Han Righteous Army ceased to exist as an effective combat force, and the Japanese disbanded the remnants.

Sources 

 中国抗日战争正面战场作战记 (China's Anti-Japanese War Combat Operations)
 Guo Rugui, editor-in-chief Huang Yuzhang
 Jiangsu People's Publishing House
 Date published : 2005-7-1
 
 Online in Chinese: 
  日本侵绥的战备企图和中日    Japanese invasion of Suiyuan to prepare their planned union of China and Japan

See also 
Mengjiang

Second Sino-Japanese War
Mengjiang
Disbanded armies
Chinese collaborators with Imperial Japan